Elan Steinberg was an Israeli-born head of World Jewish Congress.

Early life and career
Elan Steinberg was born to a Polish Jewish family in Rishon LeZion, Israel, in 1952. When he was two years old, his family emigrated to the United States. He studied at Brooklyn College and City University of New York. Later, he joined City University of New York as a faculty member.

In 1974, he joined World Jewish Congress. When he left the congress in 2004, he was the executive director.

Steinberg also served as a vice president of the American Gathering of Jewish Holocaust Survivors and their Descendants.

References

1952 births
2012 deaths
American people of Polish-Jewish descent
Israeli emigrants to the United States
Brooklyn College alumni
City University of New York alumni
People from Rishon LeZion
City University of New York faculty